Forte de São Sebastião is a fort in the Azores.

The Fort of São Sebastião, also referred to as Castelo de São Sebastião or simply Castelinho, is located in the port of Pipas, parish of Nossa Senhora da Conceição, in the city and municipality of Angra do Heroísmo, on the south coast of Terceira Island, in the Azores.

Built on a small hill that forms the extreme ESE of angra bay, in the historic center of the city, this fort was built in 1580 and represented a new concept for coastal protection, it was also the first major maritime fortification in the city. It crossed fires with the Fortress of São João Baptista in Monte Brasil, in defense of the port of Pipas, at the time the most important anchorage and shipyard of the island where they climbed the vessels of the Career of India and the fleets of Brazil, in transit to the Kingdom of Portugal. The importance of his position derived from the ease with which he could militarily close the bay of Angra. On Holy Thursday 1641, on March 28, in the context of the revolt against the dominant Spanish presence, it was conquered by the company of ordinances of Ribeirinha, commanded by Manuel Jaques de Oliveira.

Nowadays this historic fort is a hotel included in the Pousadas de Portugal group which features iconic and historic places of Portugal. It is open for visits every day of the week, visits are free.

Construction 
It was built at the suggestion of Isidoro de Almeida and designed by the architect Tomaz Benedito de Pesaro to Italian taste. This fortress was finished in the time of El-Rei D. Sebastião, from which he withdraws the invocation. Demonstration of a new idea of coastal defense, already sensitive and aware of the new functions of port support, could cross fire with São Benedicto (Spanish name for the Fortress of São João Baptista), on the coast of Monte Brasil.

References

Fort Sao Sebastiao
Sao Sebastiao